Thomas Child (March 18, 1818 – March 9, 1869) was a U.S. Representative from New York.

Life
Born in Bakersfield, Vermont, he was the son of attorney Timothy Child (1779-1862) and Lydia Adams Child (1780-1853). Child attended the common schools and entered the University of Vermont at Burlington at the age of fourteen. He graduated in 1838, and served the same year as a member of the State constitutional convention. He studied law with his father, was admitted to the bar in September 1839, and commenced practice in Berkshire, Vermont. He was a partner of Homer E. Royce, who had also studied with Timothy Child Sr., and served as a Justice of the Peace in 1840. He moved to New York City about 1848 and engaged in the distilling business.

Child was elected as a Whig to the 34th United States Congress, for a term beginning on March 4, 1855, but never took his seat due to illness. On March 3, 1857, the House resolved that his salary be paid to him from August 18, 1856, to March 3, 1857, as "though he had been in regular attendance at the sittings of the House".

He moved to Port Richmond on Staten Island, in 1857 and retired from active business. He was Town Supervisor of Northfield in 1865 and 1866. He was a member of the New York State Assembly (Richmond County) in 1866, elected as a Republican.

He died in Port Richmond on March 9, 1869, and was buried at the Green-Wood Cemetery in Brooklyn.

See also
List of members-elect of the United States House of Representatives who never took their seats

References

External links

1818 births
1869 deaths
19th-century American lawyers
19th-century American politicians
Burials at Green-Wood Cemetery
Democratic Party members of the New York State Assembly
New York (state) lawyers
People from Bakersfield, Vermont
People from Staten Island
Town supervisors in New York (state)
University of Vermont alumni
Vermont lawyers
Whig Party members of the United States House of Representatives from New York (state)